The Cauchy–Schwarz inequality (also called Cauchy–Bunyakovsky–Schwarz inequality) is considered one of the most important and widely used inequalities in mathematics.

Schwarz gave the modern proof of the integral version.

Statement of the inequality 

where  is the inner product. Examples of inner products include the real and complex dot product; see the examples in inner product.

so that this norm and the inner product are related by the defining condition  where  is always a non-negative real number (even if the inner product is complex-valued). 
By taking the square root of both sides of the above inequality, the Cauchy–Schwarz inequality can be written in its more familiar form:

Special cases

Sedrakyan's lemma - Positive real numbers 
Sedrakyan's inequality, also called  Bergström's inequality, Engel's form, the T2 lemma, or Titu's lemma, states that for real numbers  and positive real numbers :

This form is especially helpful when the inequality involves fractions where the numerator is a perfect square.

R2 - The plane 

The real vector space  denotes the 2-dimensional plane. It is also the 2-dimensional Euclidean space where the inner product is the dot product. 
If  and  then the Cauchy–Schwarz inequality becomes:

The form above is perhaps the easiest in which to understand the inequality, since the square of the cosine can be at most 1, which occurs when the vectors are in the same or opposite directions.

where equality holds if and only if the vector  is in the same or opposite direction as the vector , or if one of them is the zero vector.

Rn - n-dimensional Euclidean space 
In Euclidean space  with the standard inner product, which is the dot product, the Cauchy–Schwarz inequality becomes:

The Cauchy–Schwarz inequality can be proved using only ideas from elementary algebra in this case. 
Consider the following quadratic polynomial in 

Since it is nonnegative, it has at most one real root for  hence its discriminant is less than or equal to zero. That is,

Cn - n-dimensional Complex space

That is,

L2 

For the inner product space of square-integrable complex-valued functions, the following inequality:

The Hölder inequality is a generalization of this.

Applications

Analysis 
In any inner product space, the triangle inequality is a consequence of the Cauchy–Schwarz inequality, as is now shown: 

Taking square roots gives the triangle inequality:

The Cauchy–Schwarz inequality is used to prove that the inner product is a continuous function with respect to the topology induced by the inner product itself.

Geometry 
The Cauchy–Schwarz inequality allows one to extend the notion of "angle between two vectors" to any real inner-product space by defining:

The Cauchy–Schwarz inequality proves that this definition is sensible, by showing that the right-hand side lies in the interval  and justifies the notion that (real) Hilbert spaces are simply generalizations of the Euclidean space. It can also be used to define an angle in complex inner-product spaces, by taking the absolute value or the real part of the right-hand side, as is done when extracting a metric from quantum fidelity.

Probability theory 

Let  and  be random variables, then the covariance inequality is given by:

After defining an inner product on the set of random variables using the expectation of their product,

the Cauchy–Schwarz inequality becomes

To prove the covariance inequality using the Cauchy–Schwarz inequality, let  and  then

where  denotes variance and  denotes covariance.

Proofs

There are many different proofs of the Cauchy–Schwarz inequality other than those given below. 
When consulting other sources, there are often two sources of confusion. First, some authors define  to be linear in the second argument rather than the first. 

This section gives proofs of the following theorem:

 

In all of the proofs given below, the proof in the trivial case where at least one of the vectors is zero (or equivalently, in the case where ) is the same. It is presented immediately below only once to reduce repetition.

If  where  is some scalar then 

The case where  for some scalar  is very similar, with the main difference between the complex conjugation of 
 

If  which happens if and only if  then  and  so that in particular, the Cauchy-Schwarz inequality holds because both sides of it are  

Consequently, the Cauchy-Schwarz inequality only needs to be proven only for non-zero vectors and also only the non-trivial direction of the Equality Characterization must be shown.

Proof 1

The Cauchy–Schwarz equality (and the rest of the theorem) is an almost immediate corollary of the following : 

 

Equality  is readily verified by elementarily expanding  (via the definition of the norm) and then simplifying:

Swapping  and  gives rise to:

and thus

Proof 2

Let

It follows from the linearity of the inner product in its first argument that:

Therefore,  is a vector orthogonal to the vector  (Indeed,  is the projection of  onto the plane orthogonal to ) We can thus apply the Pythagorean theorem to

which gives

Proof for real inner products

Let  be a real inner product space. Consider an arbitrary pair  and the function  defined by  
Since the inner product is positive-definite,  only takes non-negative values. On the other hand,  can be expanded using the bilinearity of the inner product and using the fact that  for real inner products:
 
Thus,  is a polynomial of degree  (unless  which is a case that can be independently verified). Since the sign of  does not change, the discriminant of this polynomial must be non-positive:

The conclusion follows.

For the equality case, notice that  happens if and only if  If  then  and hence

Proof for the dot product

 

To simplify, let 

Therefore, to complete the proof it is sufficient to prove that this quadratic either has no real roots or exactly one real root, because this will imply: 

Substituting the values of  into  gives:

which is a sum of terms that are each  by the trivial inequality:  for all  
This proves the inequality and so to finish the proof, it remains to show that equality is achievable.
The equality  is the equality case for Cauchy-Schwarz after inspecting 

which proves that equality is achievable.

Generalizations 
Various generalizations of the Cauchy–Schwarz inequality exist. Hölder's inequality generalizes it to  norms. More generally, it can be interpreted as a special case of the definition of the norm of a linear operator on a Banach space (Namely, when the space is a Hilbert space).  Further generalizations are in the context of operator theory, e.g. for operator-convex functions and operator algebras, where the domain and/or range are replaced by a C*-algebra or W*-algebra.

An inner product can be used to define a positive linear functional. For example, given a Hilbert space  being a finite measure, the standard inner product gives rise to a positive functional  by   Conversely, every positive linear functional  on  can be used to define an  inner product  where  is the pointwise complex conjugate of  In this language, the Cauchy–Schwarz inequality becomes

which extends verbatim to positive functionals on C*-algebras:

The next two theorems are further examples in operator algebra.

This extends the fact  when  is a linear functional. The case when  is self-adjoint, that is,  is sometimes known as Kadison's inequality.

Another generalization is a refinement obtained by interpolating between both sides of the Cauchy-Schwarz inequality:  

This theorem can be deduced from Hölder's inequality. There are also non commutative versions for operators and tensor products of matrices.

A survey of matrix versions of Cauchy-Schwarz inequality and Kantorovich inequality is available.

See also

Notes

Citations

References 

 
 
 
 

  
 .
 
 .

External links 

 Earliest Uses: The entry on the Cauchy–Schwarz inequality has some historical information.
 Example of application of Cauchy–Schwarz inequality to determine Linearly Independent Vectors Tutorial and Interactive program.

Augustin-Louis Cauchy
Inequalities
Linear algebra
Operator theory
Articles containing proofs
Mathematical analysis
Probabilistic inequalities